The European Journal of Work and Organizational Psychology was established in 1991 and is a peer-reviewed academic journal published quarterly by the European Association of Work and Organizational Psychology. Content includes papers on organizational change, organizational climate, teamwork, motivation, innovation, leadership, bullying, stress in the workplace, burnout, job satisfaction, job design, selection and training.

See also 
 Industrial and organizational psychology
 Occupational health psychology

References 

Publications established in 1991
Organizational psychology journals
Quarterly journals
English-language journals
Academic journals published by learned and professional societies